Spaced Out may refer to:

 Spaced Out, French–Canadian animated television show
 Spaced Out, US-title of British science fiction comedy Outer Touch
  Spaced Out – The Very Best of Leonard Nimoy & William Shatner, 1997 compilation album 
 “Spaced Out”, an episode of the Japanese-American animated TV show Hi Hi Puffy AmiYumi